Relapse (stylized as ) is the sixth studio album by American rapper Eminem. It was released on May 15, 2009, through Aftermath Entertainment, Shady Records, and Interscope Records. The album serves as Eminem's return to original material since Encore (2004), following a four-year hiatus from recording due to his writer's block and an addiction to prescription sleeping medication. Recording sessions for the album took place between 2007 and 2009 at several recording studios, and Dr. Dre, Mark Batson, and Eminem handled production.

Relapse is a concept album that revolves around horror, drug rehabilitation and relapse. A return of his Slim Shady alter ego, Eminem stated that the album's theme was more reminiscent of The Slim Shady LP (1999) and The Marshall Mathers LP (2000). In September 2007, Dr. Dre stated his intention to dedicate two months to the production of the album. Working with Dr. Dre allowed Eminem to pick the beats from Dr. Dre's catalog that challenged his rhythm to experiment with different flows. During the recording period, a handful of songs intended for Relapse were leaked on the Internet.

One of the most anticipated albums of 2009, Relapse debuted at No. 1 on the Billboard 200, selling 608,000 copies in its first week. It also reached number one in twelve other countries. It produced four singles: "Crack a Bottle", "We Made You", "3 a.m.", and "Beautiful", as well as the promotional single: "Old Time's Sake". "Crack a Bottle", featuring Dr. Dre and 50 Cent, reached number one on the Billboard Hot 100. Relapse was certified double platinum by the Recording Industry Association of America (RIAA).

Critically, the album received mixed reviews. Reviewers generally praised its production, but were divided in their responses towards the writing and overuse of accents throughout the album. Nonetheless, it won Eminem the Grammy Award for Best Rap Album, while "Crack a Bottle" won for Best Rap Performance by a Duo or Group. The album later found a strong cult following among fans and critics establishing Relapse as a cult classic.

Background 
After releasing Encore in 2004, Eminem planned to take some time off from recording his own music to become a hip hop producer for other rap acts, especially for the artists signed on his own label Shady Records. However, Eminem entered his hiatus after cancelling the European leg of the Anger Management Tour in the summer of 2005 because of exhaustion and an addiction to prescription sleeping drugs. In the following year, the rapper's remarriage to his former wife Kimberly Scott lasted only eleven weeks before a second divorce, while his best friend and fellow rapper Proof was later shot and killed during an altercation outside a Detroit nightclub. Devastated, Eminem relapsed into prescription drug abuse and became increasingly reclusive. In a June 2009 interview for XXL, Eminem elaborated on the impact of Proof's death on him, stating:

Speculation on an upcoming album by Eminem was reported since mid–2007 from announcements made by artists 50 Cent and Stat Quo, former members of Shady Records. Also, rapper Bizarre – a member of the hip hop group D12 – stated that the release of the group's third studio album was on hold because Interscope Records wanted to release Eminem's album first. By the end of the year, additional musicians associated with Shady Records – including The Alchemist, Bishop Lamont, Cashis and Obie Trice – had confirmed on different occasions that the rapper was effectively working on a new album. On September 12, 2007, during a call at the radio station WQHT Hot 97, Eminem stated that he was in limbo and was not sure whether he would release any new material in the near future. He then elaborated that at that point he was constantly working in the recording studio and had come to terms with his personal issues. However, in December 2007, he was hospitalized because of an overdose of methadone. In early 2008, he began a 12-step program to recover from his addiction; in a later interview, he said that he got sober on April 20, 2008. He has stayed sober since then.

Recording 

Eminem had continued recording throughout 2005, and released most of this work on his Shady Records compilation album Eminem Presents: The Re-Up. He also recorded the track "Beautiful" in late 2007, which would later become the fifth and final single on Relapse, and also one of the only songs on the entire album in which Eminem recorded when he wasn't sober. Eminem began the major recording stages of Relapse in mid-2008, after completing a 12-step program to control his drug addiction. Record producer and long-time Detroit collaborator Jeff Bass of the Bass Brothers worked with Eminem on 25 tracks, two years after the rapper had received treatment for his sleeping pill addiction in 2005. Depressed by Proof's death, Eminem fell into a period of "writer's block", where he felt everything he wrote was not worth recording. To compensate for this, Bass chose to follow a production style that would allow the artist to rap "off the top of his head, as opposed to writing a story". Eminem would then freestyle or record vocals one line at a time before interrupting and then recording another line. At the same time, according to Eminem's song rights supervisor Joel Martin, the rapper began to collect additional songs without noticing it. He would often record or produce material initially intended for the musical projects of other artists, but end up with tracks he really liked.

Eminem purchased the Effigy Studio in Ferndale, Michigan, in 2007, and ended his working relationship with much of his former production team of the 54 Sound recording studio, including the Bass Brothers. In September 2007, Dr. Dre stated his intention to dedicate two months to the production of Relapse. Working with Dr. Dre allowed Eminem to concentrate on the processes of songwriting rather than the production, which was largely taken care of by Dre. The rapper justified his choice of using Dr. Dre for the vast majority of the production due to their long collaborative history and a musical "chemistry" only he and Dr. Dre shared. This allowed the rapper to pick the beats from Dr. Dre's catalog that challenged him rhythm-wise to experiment with different flows. The making of the album progressed at the Effigy Studio up to a year after, as recording sessions were then moved to Orlando, Florida in September 2008. By then, Eminem had begun to start writing verses again at such a pace that he often took more time to record the lyrics than write them. He credited sobriety for his new creative run, acknowledging that his mind was free of the clutter that "blocked" him during his drug abuse in the last years. Dr. Dre would start the song-writing process by giving a number of his beats on a CD to Eminem, who in a separate room in the studio would listen and select the ones he preferred and inspired him the most. Eminem would then write lyrics to the instrumentals, while Dr. Dre and his production staff continued to create new music. Once he felt he had written lyrics for enough songs, Eminem would dedicate an entire day to record his songs to the point that he would lose his voice for the following days. At that point, the rapper would then begin to write lyrics for new songs. The process continued for the next six months and allowed Eminem to have enough material for a second album, initially called Relapse 2, which became Recovery.

During this recording period, a handful of songs intended for Relapse were leaked on the Internet, including an incomplete version of "Crack a Bottle". The song was finished in January 2009 and featured vocals from Dr. Dre and 50 Cent. Despite the leak, the album was being completed in a state of near-total secrecy, according to the British newspaper The Independent. Even Polydor Records, the multinational owner of Interscope, had no information on the album at the time. On April 23, Eminem suggested he and possibly Dr. Dre were the only ones in possession of the final copy of Relapse; his manager Paul Rosenberg added that even Eminem's record labels were not in possession of the music less than a month before its release to prevent possible bootlegging.

Music and lyrics 

In an interview for XXL, Eminem described the concept behind Relapse to be the ending of his drug rehabilitation and thus rap as if he was on drugs again, as well as the return of his fictional alter-ego Slim Shady. According to the interviewer Datwon Thomas, Eminem's influences for the album came from his own past drug issues and from television shows and documentaries involving crime and serial killers, as the rapper was fascinated by "serial killers and their psyche and their mind states". In a May 2009 interview for The New York Times, Eminem discussed his view of serial killers, stating:

Music critic Robert Christgau interpreted the opening line to the album featuring the phrase "horror corridor" as Eminem telling listeners that it is a horrorcore album. Ben Kaplan of the Vancouver Courier also categorized it as a horrorcore album. Ann Powers of the Los Angeles Times said that the album's "horrorcore scenes" show Eminem as "a madman created by the hypocrisy of therapy". Music journalist Rob Sheffield remarked on its sensationalist drug references and said that Relapse is "a hip-hop version" of comedian Richard Pryor's Live on the Sunset Strip (1982).

Songs 
Relapse opens with the skit "Dr. West", where actor Dominic West voices a drug counselor whose untrustworthiness causes Eminem to fall back to drugs and the return to his Slim Shady character. The skit leads to "3 A.M.", where Eminem depicts himself as a serial killer during a murder spree. When "3 A.M." was released as a single prior to the album's own release, Eminem noted that the song closely mirrored what he believed was the overall dark tone of the album. On "My Mom", the rapper traces his addictive tendencies to his mother and shows how he became a drug addict just like her. Eminem continues his family tales on "Insane", where he imagines himself as a victim of child sexual abuse. For Eminem, the goal of "Insane" was to make song that would disgust the listeners and "make them puke", adding that he came up with this idea after thinking of the song's first line ("I was born with a dick in my brain/Yeah, fucked in the head"). Mariah Carey and her then current husband Nick Cannon are targeted in "Bagpipes from Baghdad", where Eminem raps over a pungi loop.

After "Hello", where Eminem re-introduces himself after years of being absent "mentally", he continues his violent fantasies on "Same Song & Dance", where he abducts and murders Lindsay Lohan and Britney Spears. The upbeat rhythm of "Same Song & Dance" reminded Eminem of a dance track, which inspired him to write something in order to "get women to dance to it and not really know what the fuck they're dancing to" without listening to the lyrics. On the ninth track of the album, "We Made You", Eminem mocks several celebrities and plays the role of a "pop star serial killer". Eminem noted that his various "celebrity bashings" were not meant to be seen as personal attacks, but it was rather "picking names out of a hat" that rhymed with the words he wanted to use during the writing process. On "Medicine Ball" Eminem mocks and impersonates deceased actor Christopher Reeve in order to get his audience to "laugh at it, and then almost feel bad for laughing". The next track is "Stay Wide Awake", which Eminem raps about assaulting and raping women. Dr. Dre also has a guest appearance on "Old Time's Sake", a duet Eminem described as a "fun, yet reminiscent record old times" in which he and Dre rap back and forth between each other, advocating the use of marijuana for creative and financial benefits. Song "Must Be the Ganja" follows, where Eminem raps that working in the recording studio is like a drug and an addiction for him.

After the skit "Mr. Mathers", where Eminem is found unconscious in bathroom by paramedics due to a drug overdose and taken to a hospital, "Déjà Vu" addresses his overdose in 2007 and drug dependency during his hiatus from music. On the song, Eminem also explains how this has affected him in the last five years, to the point where his daughter has become scared of her father's behavior. "Beautiful", a ballad which samples "Reaching Out" by Queen + Paul Rodgers, also deals with the same time period where Eminem believed he had "reached rock bottom" and lost hope for his future. Eminem felt it was important to include "Beautiful" on the album as a reminder to himself as well as "anybody who is in a dark place [...] that you can get out of it". After "Crack a Bottle", a collaboration with Dr. Dre and 50 Cent, Relapse ends with "Underground". On this final track, Eminem sought to bring back to his music and lyrics the subject matter and punchlines reminiscent of "The Hiphop Shop times" (The Hiphop Shop was a clothing store in Detroit where local rappers, including Eminem, would compete in freestyle battles), before he had become famous and thus did not have worry about the explicit content of his lyrics.

Relapse: Refill 

Because Eminem recorded far more material than he could use for one album and felt that he had to offer his fans more music after staying on hiatus for so long, fellow D12 member Swift confirmed that Eminem in fact had planned to put out two albums the same year, following with Relapse 2, in late 2009. According to Angela Yee's Shade 45 interview with Eminem on April 23, 2009, Relapse 2 was to be a continuation of Relapse. During the interview, Eminem confirmed: "It's extremely close to being finished, it just depends on how many songs I want to put on it." Eminem also explained the album was more "emotionally driven" than Relapse, which was, as he explains, "[just] rap records". Guest appearances were expected to come from the likes of Dr. Dre, 50 Cent, D12, Royce da 5'9", Lloyd Banks and Cashis. The album was subsequently pushed back for an early 2010 release, so Eminem decided to re-release Relapse as Relapse: Refill, which includes a bonus disc featuring seven new tracks, including the single "Forever" (originally on More Than a Game soundtrack) and "Taking My Ball" (released with DJ Hero), as well as five previously unreleased tracks. On its re-release, Eminem stated: "I want to deliver more material for the fans this year like I originally planned. Hopefully these tracks on The Refill will tide the fans over until we put out Relapse 2 next year."

On April 13, 2010, Eminem tweeted "There is no Relapse 2", thus announcing that the album has been scrapped in favor of his new project Recovery. While recording Relapse 2 and witnessing the mixed reaction of its predecessor among fans and critics alike, Eminem decided to throw away most of the recorded material and started from scratch. The result did not seem to him as continuation of Relapse but more of an individual project that deserved its own name. Eminem said: "I had originally planned for Relapse 2 to come out last year. But as I kept recording and working with new producers, the idea of a sequel to Relapse started to make less and less sense to me, and I wanted to make a completely new album. The music on Recovery came out very different from Relapse, and I think it deserves its own title." The now-renamed album debuted at number 1 on the US Billboard 200 chart, with first-week sales of 741,000 copies in the United States. As of September 25, 2011, the album had sold 4,040,000 copies in the United States and was also the best-selling album of 2010 worldwide, earning a Grammy Award for Best Rap Album.

Notes
 signifies an additional producer.

Release and promotion 
In 2007, Shady Records rapper Cashis discussed the album, referring to it by the title King Mathers and adding that it would be released later that year. However, Eminem's publicist Dennis Dennehy would later deny this and stated that "there was no album scheduled for a 2007 release" and that, as of August 2007, there was no confirmed title. No other official statement was made for over a year. It was not until September 15, 2008, at an event held by Shade 45 to celebrate the publication of Eminem's autobiography The Way I Am, the rapper confirmed his plans to release a studio album by the title of Relapse. During the party, he also previewed to the audience a song called "I'm Having a Relapse".

In regards to the album's release date, Rolling Stone wrote in its October 2008 issue that Virgin Megastores had planned to distribute Relapse on November 27, 2008, in the United States. On October 27, a spokesperson for Interscope explained that there was no official date at the time, and that any release dates that had been posted on any website were unfounded. In a phone conversation during the finale of Total Request Live on November 16, 2008, Eminem asserted that Relapse would be released during the first quarter of 2009, precisely during either of the first two months of the year, explaining that he was in the process of selecting the songs for the album.

Despite the leak two months before, "Crack a Bottle" was eventually released for legal paid digital download as well as a promotional single on February 2, 2009, and also reached the number one position on the US Billboard Hot 100; according to Eminem's manager Paul Rosenberg, a music video for the song had been produced and directed by Syndrome and was released in several parts of the world from May to early June. At the time of the release, various contradicting reports disputed whether the song would be included on Relapse, but a press release from head label Universal Music Group confirmed the single's inclusion on the album. In similar press statements after March 5, Universal made public the regional release dates for Relapse: as early as May 15, 2009, in Italy and the Netherlands; most other European countries and Brazil on May 18; and the following day in the United States and Australia. Additionally, the record label also announced a second album by Eminem, then called Relapse 2 but later titled Recovery, which was to be released by the end of the year, but expected in June 2010. Eminem explained that he and Dr. Dre had recorded a considerable amount of music and thus, by releasing two albums, would allow listeners to have access to all of his music.

After the release of "Crack a Bottle", the music video of the single "We Made You" was aired on April 7, and became available for purchase a week later on April 13. The video was directed by Joseph Kahn and premiered simultaneously on several MTV channels as well as MTV's website. On April 28, the third overall single for the album, "3 a.m.", was released again for paid music download. A music video for "3 a.m." was directed by Syndrome and filmed in Detroit. It premiered on May 2 on Cinemax, several days after a trailer for the video was posted online. Two more singles were distributed prior to the album's release, as "Old Time's Sake" and "Beautiful" went on sale on the iTunes Store on May 5 and 12 respectively. "My Darling" and "Careful What You Wish For" were made available upon purchase of the Premium version of the album. The track "Insane" peaked at position 85 on the US Billboard Hot 100 chart on the album's release via iTunes.

On April 4, 2009, CBS featured Eminem during the network's coverage of the 2009 NCAA Final Four in a segment where he recited the spoken word "Love Letter to Detroit". Later on the same day, the rapper inducted the hip hop group Run-D.M.C. to the Rock and Roll Hall of Fame. Adam Graham of The Detroit News described this as "all part of the calculated promotional push" for Relapse. The rapper performed live at the 2009 MTV Movie Awards on May 31, while he appeared on the covers of hip hop magazines Vibe and XXL in their respective issues in June 2009; the latter was created by a deal struck with Eminem and Marvel Comics, where the rapper would pose as Marvel's main vigilante The Punisher. Marvel created an issue of the comic co-starring Eminem. An iPhone game to accompany the album was released on May 19, 2009.

While on the Never Say Never tour, fellow group members Swifty and Kuniva (D12) along with Royce Da 5'9" stopped by KISS 100FM for a live interview and spoke on Relapse. Royce stated that the album will be a game changer and jokingly said he might have to push his own album back three years after Eminem drops his. Kuniva added that D12 recorded many tracks for Relapse but wasn't sure if they would make the album or not. Swifty then confirmed that Eminem would be dropping two albums in 2009, with Relapse 2 following Relapse. Relapse was re-released on December 21, 2009, as Relapse: Refill, with seven bonus tracks and including the single "Forever" (originally on More Than a Game soundtrack), "Taking My Ball" (released with DJ Hero), and five previously unreleased tracks. On its re-release, Eminem stated: "I want to deliver more material for the fans this year like I originally planned. Hopefully these tracks on The Refill will tide the fans over until we put out Relapse 2 next year".

Artwork 
The album cover for Relapse was first published through Eminem's Twitter account on April 21, 2009. It illustrates a head shot of the rapper composed by a mosaic of thousands of pills. A sticker on the cover resembles a prescription drug label, on which the patient is Eminem and the prescribing doctor is Dr. Dre. Gil Kaufman of MTV News described the cover as a reference to the rapper's struggle and addiction to prescription drugs, adding that it follows Eminem's habit of displaying personal issues in his art. The album booklet and back cover follow a pill prescription design. On the backside of the booklet is a dedication to Proof, where Eminem explains that he's sober and that he tried to write a song for him, but that he didn't find one of them good enough therefore he dedicates the whole album to him. The CD itself is meant to represent the lid on a bottle of prescription pills, grey with the big red inscription "Push Down & Turn". The cover for Relapse: Refill is the same, with the background color changed from black to white. The prescription drug label is scratched out and the writing "Refill" is posed next to it.

Critical reception 

Relapse received a mostly mixed reception from music critics upon release. It holds an aggregate score of 59, based on 27 reviews, at Metacritic. Despite calling it an "impressively focused and clever work", Los Angeles Times writer Ann Powers felt the music was "not transcendent" and commented that "Eminem could have pulled his music into a new category. What he presents is still powerful, but narrowly cast". Andy Gill of The Independent found the album to be "drably repetitive, while its dated tone is emphasised by the return of Dr. Dre as producer." NMEs Louis Pattison found Eminem's wordplay "wicked in the depths of its depravity", but felt that "the overriding feel is of an album just too jaded, too joyless to truly count as a return to form". Slant Magazine's Eric Henderson viewed that "the further Relapse strays from narrative veracity, the more one suspects his fanbase feels he's tapping into his bottomless well for horror-show grandstanding." The Times called Relapse "an album that sits square between what Eminem is theoretically still capable of and what we feared he has become." Nathan Rabin, writing in The A.V. Club, panned it as "facile pre-adolescent shock mixed with gory, corpse-strewn, Fangoria-damaged horrorcore." MSN Music's Robert Christgau called it a "dud" and accused Eminem of sensationalism: "this is not a Slim Shady album. Slim Shady had a lightness about him".

In a positive review, Rolling Stone magazine's Rob Sheffield called the album a "more painful, honest and vital record" that is on-par or better than Eminem's 2002 album The Eminem Show. Stephen Thomas Erlewine of Allmusic described the album as "musically white-hot, dense, and dramatic" and said that "his flow is so good, his wordplay so sharp, it seems churlish to wish that he addressed something other than his long-standing obsessions and demons". The Daily Telegraph commended its honest depiction of Eminem's drug addiction and overuse. Although he found its concept "spotty", Vibes Benjamin Meadows-Ingram praised Eminem's lyricism, writing that "Em works wonders with words, expanding the boundaries of the art of rap itself [...] the composition is experimental and abstract, a master toying with form". At the 52nd Grammy Awards, the album won a Grammy Award for Best Rap Album.

Retrospective appraisals 
Despite the lukewarm reviews at its release, the album gained a strong cult following and it is considered by many as one of Eminem's classic albums. Mark Batson, one of the co-producers with Dr. Dre, said: "When we made Relapse with Eminem, it was not well received at the moment but now it is considered to be a classic. That's how it goes." Eminem's long time collaborator, Paul Rosenberg singled out the song Underground as one of his favorite songs.

Mitch Findlay from HotNewHipHop touted Relapse as Eminem's strongest project after The Eminem Show: "Relapse is probably the strongest of Eminem's post-comeback catalog, largely in part to some excellent production from Dr. Dre, Dawaun Parker, and Mike Elizondo. Plus, Em seems to be in the zone here, especially when it comes to his flow. The concept, in which he embodies a depraved, accented serial killer, can be a little tiresome, but it also leads to a gratuitous bout of lyrical and hilarious Grand-Guignol." He singled out "Hello", "Beautiful" and "Deja Vu" as highlights. In 2019, Findlay included "Same Song & Dance" and "Music Box" on his "Dr. Dre's Top 10 Most Haunting Beats". Complex magazine's "The 100 Best Eminem Song" ranks "Stay Wide Awake" at number 86, "Elevator" at number 81, "My Darling" at number 79, "Underground" at number 74, "3 a.m." at number 67, "Insane" at number 27, and "Déjà Vu" at number 20.

Comedian and writer Drew Landry from DJBooth called Relapse a "dark, disturbing and often hilarious album" and said: "Relapse sounds like a "how many violent dick jokes can I shout before someone tries to decapitate me" science experiment. If you simply sit back and embrace the depravity, though, it's oddly glorious. Eminem wasn't trying to make radio hits nor was he trying to inspire fans; he just wanted to gross us all out. And in that regard, holy shit does he succeed." He singled out "Insane", "Stay Wide Awake", "Same Song & Dance", "Medicine Ball" and "3 a.m" as the 5 most disgusting songs on the album and referred to the album as "an episode of South Park written by Stephen King".

Patrick Bierut from UDiscoverMusic named Relapse "the true marvel Of Eminem's sinister return to hip-hop" and said "Relapse remains one of the most overlooked releases not only of Eminem's career, but the mid-to-late 00s. Not only is it the Eminem album in which Dr. Dre had the truest hand in production, it's also the most remarkable demonstration of his raw ability to rap better than almost anyone else. Due to its divisive content, however, Relapse doesn't get enough credit for being the marvel it truly is."

Spin also included some songs of the album on the top 100 of All 289 Eminem Songs, Ranked article, included "Déjà Vu" at 36 position, "Crack a Bottle" at number 48, "Beautiful" at number 62, "3 a.m" at number 68, "Elevator" at number 76, "Stay Wide Awake" at number 79 and "Underground" at number 82. HipHopDX called Relapse a "horrorcore masterpiece" and said: "the record stands as an artistic achievement that further solidifies Eminem as one of the greatest, most creative MCs to ever pick up a microphone. The article goes on to reflect the changing fan sentiment toward the album, stating that it took "years to uncover its brilliance".

Eminem's thoughts on the album

On his following album Recovery (2010), Eminem made reference to Relapse and criticizes it in the second verse of the song "Not Afraid": "In fact, let's be honest/That last Relapse CD was 'ehh'/ Perhaps I ran them accents into the ground/ Relax, I ain't going back to that now". He also referenced it in the song "Talkin' 2 Myself" saying he was still getting the pills out of his system at that point which led to its subpar status.

He slowed down his feelings about the album after that saying "I don't hate Relapse. I don't hate it at all, but when I'm looking back at an album I do have a tendency, and especially with that album, to run things into the ground. That was one of those instances where I got in a zone, like, "Yo I just want to be this demented serial killer on this album. And part of that was a growing process to get to Recovery, working through those steps, relearning how to rap, and relearning where I need to be at." He reiterates this statement during his 2013 Q&A with Rolling Stone saying "I don't hate the record. I want to rap and be able to always try to do my best lyrically, but at the same time find the right balance between that and making the right songs. And you know, I don't know if I necessarily found that balance yet, because I was just getting sober and just kind of finding my feet again and so there was a lot of songs that were just like "Ha ha this is funny!" You know, walking around and joking around with your friends and shit and it ends up on the record and you're laughing about it. Because when I got sober it was like – I've said this before – but it just was like "Oh shit! I can think straight again!" So I don't know if that record was particularly my best work as far as songs, writing songs that felt like something, that brought some kind of emotion. I ran accents into the grounds. I got stuck on that kind of serial killer, crazy vibe and just kind of went with it.

In 2013, Eminem also addressed the mindstate he had while working on 2009's Relapse saying: "It was interesting, man. I don't know if before Relapse, if we're talking the Infinite album and pre-signing with Dre and all that, from that point on, I don't know if I ever did anything or did much sober at all. Relapse was the first album and first recordings that I did when the lights went on and I was sober. I was still trying to figure things out...It's interesting. Fun time. I had a fun time." He reiterated his feeling about the album "I felt Relapse was, I don't know. I don't know if people know what I really had to go through to be able to make Relapse and to be able to write again and to be able to think again and just normal everyday bodily functions and functions in my mind. I don't want to say I wasn't in a place to record again, but I needed time. I needed time to be able to figure out things. I wanted to be able to make my songs feel like something again. I know a lot of stuff on Relapse was comical and funny punchline jokes, but a lot of the songs didn't really feel like anything. I had to go back and listen to some of my older music to try to figure out what I was doing wrong. Once I felt like I figured that out, I started making songs that felt like something again."

About the accents he used on the album: "I recorded at least 50 to 60 songs for that album and on each one I would get a little more drastic with the accents, trying to bend the words and make them rhyme in ways they wouldn't if you just said them regular. It was this gradual thing and I didn't even realize how accent-heavy the album got. Paul [Rosenberg] didn't realize it either until he went and played the music for somebody at Interscope and they were like, "Why is he doing all those accents?" So yeah, I don't know how much replay value that album has." He reiterates his statement in 2018 during the Kamikaze four-part interview: "I have made albums that definitely, probably would not be at the top of my list — Encore, Relapse — which I believe Encore is a better album than Relapse. Relapse is something I went back to and cringed at. Like, 'Jesus Christ, I didn't realize I was doing that many accents."

On his album Revival (2017), Eminem also made references to Relapse especially on the closing song "Arose": "I'm 'bout to, like a rematch, outdo Relapse/ With Recovery, Mathers LP2/ Help propel me to victory laps/ Gas toward 'em and fast forward the past".

In 2020, Eminem looks back positively on the album for the 11th anniversary of its release. Eminem also emulates his Relapse rap style in Music to be Murdered By: Side B (Deluxe Edition) on the song "Discombobulated".

In 2022, Eminem also looks back more positively on the album during his manager and collaborator, Paul Rosenberg's podcast, although the Relapse vibe is not something he is dreaming of reviving: "I don't have a problem with some of the rhymes, and I don't have a problem with some of the verse's choices lyrically. It's just the accents. I feel like I sounded so demented in that shit, I got cemented in that shit."

Commercial performance 
One of the most anticipated albums of 2009, Relapse was the top-selling hip hop album of the year. Upon its release, the album debuted at No. 1 on the US Billboard 200 chart, selling 608,000 copies in its first week. In Canada, the album sold 64,000 copies in its first week and debuted at number 1 on the Canadian Albums Chart. By the end of 2009, the album had sold 180,000 physical units in Canada, making it the ninth best-selling physical album in Canada of 2009. Outside of North America, Relapse managed to reach the number one spot in its first week in various other countries including Australia, France, Norway, Denmark and New Zealand, while climbing into the Top 5 in many other countries, including Germany, Italy, Finland, Spain, Belgium, the Netherlands, Austria, Switzerland and Sweden. In its second week the album stayed at number one and sold a further 211,000 copies, taking its total to 819,000 to become the fifth best-seller of the year. In the third week, Relapse dropped to number two and sold another 141,000 copies, bringing the total U.S. sales to 962,000, Relapse dropped to number three in its fourth week, selling 87,000 copies for a total of 1,049,000 in the U.S. The next week, Relapse went down to number four and sold 72,000 copies. In its sixth week, the album was at number five and sold another 47,000 copies, pushing its total sales to 1,169,000. It dropped down to the number nine in its seventh week, selling 39,000 copies and taking its total U.S. sales up to 1,207,000 copies. In its eighth week, it remained at number nine and sold a further 34,000 copies for a total of 1,241,000.

Relapse became the best selling rap album of 2009. As of March 2014, Relapse has sold 2.3 million copies in the United States. The album was certified double platinum by the Recording Industry Association of America on August 27, 2010.

Track listing 

Notes
 signifies an additional producer.
On the clean version, track 14 is written as "Must Be The".

Personnel

Musicians
Eminem – vocals (tracks 2–6, 8–10, 12–14, 16-18 and 20)
Mark Batson – keyboards (tracks 1–10, 12–16, 18 and 20)
Dawaun Parker – keyboards (tracks 1–8, 10, 12–16, 18 and 20)
Trevor Lawrence, Jr. – keyboards (tracks 1–6, 8 and 12–14)
Mike Elizondo – guitar (tracks 2, 4, 8 and 12), keyboards (tracks 2 and 4–5), bass (track 2)
Eric "Jesus" Coomes – guitar (tracks 3, 14 and 18), bass (tracks 13, 14 and 18)
Sean Cruse – guitar (tracks 5 and 16)
Charmagne Tripp – chorus vocals (track 9)
Traci Nelson – backing vocals (track 14)
Jeff Bass – keyboards, bass and guitar (track 17)
Luis Resto – keyboards (track 17)

Production
Dr. Dre – production (all tracks except 17), audio mixing (tracks 1–10, 12–16, 18–20), executive production
Eminem - production (Tracks 1, 7, 9, 15, 17)
Jeff Bass - production (Track 17)
Mike Strange – recording engineer (tracks 1–6, 8–10, 12–20), audio mixing (track 17)
Mauricio "Veto" Iragorri – recording engineer (tracks 1–10, 12–16, 18–20)
Paul Foley – recording engineer (tracks 15 and 20)
Ruben Rivera – recording engineer (track 20)
Robert Reyes – assistant recording engineer (tracks 1–10, 12–16, 18–20)
Joe Strange – assistant recording engineer (tracks 1–10, 12, 15–20)
Tommy Hicks, Jr. – assistant recording engineer (tracks 3–4, 13–14, 18)
Conor Gilligan – assistant recording engineer (track 6)
Lizette Rangel – assistant recording engineer (track 20)
Brian Gardner – mastering

Charts

Weekly charts

Year-end charts

Certifications and sales

Release history

See also 
 Grammy Award for Best Rap Album
 List of UK Albums Chart number ones of the 2000s
 List of number-one albums of 2009 (Australia)
 List of number-one albums of 2009 (Canada)
 List of number-one albums of 2009 (Ireland)
 List of number-one albums of 2009 (Japan)
 List of number-one albums of 2009 (New Zealand)
 List of number-one albums of 2009 (U.S.)
 List of UK R&B Chart number-one albums of 2009

References

Further reading

External links 
 

2009 albums
Aftermath Entertainment albums
Albums produced by Boi-1da
Albums produced by Dr. Dre
Albums produced by Eminem
Albums produced by Mark Batson
Albums produced by Dawaun Parker
Concept albums
Eminem albums
Interscope Records albums
Shady Records albums
Interscope Geffen A&M Records albums
Grammy Award for Best Rap Album
Horrorcore albums